Vladimir Gojković (Serbian Cyrillic: Владимир Гојковић; born 29 January 1981) is a Montenegrin former water polo player and current water polo coach of Montenegro national team. He won silver medal as a member of the Serbia and Montenegro team in Athens in 2004.  He was a member of the Montenegro men's national water polo team at the 2008 Summer Olympics. The team reached the semi-finals, where they were defeated by Hungary and finished fourth in the end.  At the 2012 Summer Olympics, he again played for Montenegro, who again finished fourth, losing to Serbia in the bronze medal play off.

See also
 List of Olympic medalists in water polo (men)
 List of world champions in men's water polo
 List of World Aquatics Championships medalists in water polo

References

External links
 

1981 births
Living people
Montenegrin male water polo players
Serbia and Montenegro male water polo players
Olympic water polo players of Montenegro
Olympic water polo players of Serbia and Montenegro
Water polo players at the 2004 Summer Olympics
Water polo players at the 2008 Summer Olympics
Water polo players at the 2012 Summer Olympics
Olympic silver medalists for Serbia and Montenegro
Olympic medalists in water polo
Medalists at the 2004 Summer Olympics
World Aquatics Championships medalists in water polo
Montenegrin water polo coaches
Montenegro men's national water polo team coaches
Water polo coaches at the 2016 Summer Olympics
Water polo coaches at the 2020 Summer Olympics